Marijana Marković (born 3 February 1982 in Frankfurt am Main) is a German épée fencer.

Marković won the bronze medal in the épée team event at the 2006 World Fencing Championships after beating Romania in the bronze medal match. She accomplished this with her teammates Imke Duplitzer, Claudia Bokel and Britta Heidemann.

Achievements
 2006 World Fencing Championships, team épée

External links 
 Leverkusen who's who

1982 births
Living people
German female fencers
Sportspeople from Frankfurt
Place of birth missing (living people)
German people of Serbian descent
Medalists at the 2004 Summer Olympics
Olympic silver medalists for Germany
Fencers at the 2004 Summer Olympics